A calliope (see below for pronunciation) is an American and Canadian musical instrument that produces sound by sending a gas, originally steam or, more recently, compressed air, through large whistles—originally locomotive whistles.

A calliope is typically very loud. Even some small calliopes are audible for miles. There is no way to vary tone or loudness. Musically, the only expression possible is the pitch, rhythm, and duration of the notes.

The steam calliope is also known as a steam organ (orgue à vapeur in Quebec) or steam piano (piano à vapeur in Quebec). The air-driven calliope is sometimes called a calliaphone, the name given to it by Norman Baker, but the "Calliaphone" name is registered by the Miner Company for instruments produced under the Tangley name.

In the age of steam, the steam calliope was particularly used on riverboats and in circuses. In both cases, a steam supply was readily available for other purposes. Riverboats supplied steam from their propulsion boilers. Circus calliopes were sometimes installed in steam-driven carousels, or supplied with steam from a traction engine. The traction engine could also supply electric power for lighting, and tow the calliope in the circus parade, where it traditionally came last. Other circus calliopes were self-contained, mounted on a carved, painted and gilded wagon pulled by horses, but the presence of other steam boilers in the circus meant that fuel and expertise to run the boiler were readily available. Steam instruments often had keyboards made from brass. This was in part to resist the heat and moisture of the steam, but also for the golden shine of the highly polished keys.

Calliopes can be played by a player at a keyboard or mechanically. Mechanical operation may be by a drum similar to a music box drum, or by a roll similar to that of a player piano. Some instruments have both a keyboard and a mechanism for automated operation, others only one or the other.  Some calliopes can also be played via a MIDI interface.

The whistles of a calliope are tuned to a chromatic scale, although this process is difficult and must be repeated often to maintain quality sound.  Since the pitch of each note is largely affected by the temperature of the steam, accurate tuning is nearly impossible; however, the off-pitch notes (particularly in the upper register) have become something of a trademark of the steam calliope.  A calliope may have anywhere from 25 to 67 whistles, but 32 is traditional for a steam calliope.

History

Joshua C. Stoddard of Worcester, Massachusetts patented the calliope on October 9, 1855, though his design echoes previous concepts, such as an 1832 instrument called a steam trumpet, later known as a train whistle. In 1851, William Hoyt of Dupont, Indiana claimed to have conceived of a device similar to Stoddard's calliope, but he never patented it. Later, an employee of Stoddard's American Music, Arthur S. Denny, attempted to market an "Improved Kalliope" in Europe, but it did not catch on. In 1859, he demonstrated this instrument in Crystal Palace, London. Unlike other calliopes before or since, Denny's Improved Kalliope let the player control the steam pressure, and therefore the volume of the music, while playing.

While Stoddard originally intended the calliope to replace bells at churches, it found its way onto riverboats during the paddlewheel era. While only a small number of working steamboats still exist, each has a steam calliope. These boats include the Delta Queen, the Belle of Louisville, and President. Their calliopes are played regularly on river excursions. Many surviving calliopes were built by Thomas J. Nichol, Cincinnati, Ohio, who built calliopes from 1890 until 1932. The Thomas J. Nichol calliopes featured rolled sheet copper (as used in roofing) for the resonant tube (the bell) of the whistle, lending a sweeter tone than cast bronze or brass, which were the usual materials for steam whistles of the day. David Morecraft pioneered a resurgence in the building of authentic steam calliopes of the Thomas J. Nichol style beginning in 1985 in Peru, Indiana. These calliopes are featured in Peru's annual Circus City Parade.  Morecraft died on December 5, 2016.

Stoddard's original calliope was attached to a metal roller set with pins in the manner familiar to Stoddard from the contemporary clockwork music box. The pins on the roller opened valves that admitted steam into the whistles.  Later, Stoddard replaced the cylinder with a keyboard, so that the calliope could be played like an organ.

Starting in the 1900s calliopes began using music rolls instead of a live musician. The music roll operated in a similar manner to a piano roll in a player piano, mechanically operating the keys. Many of these mechanical calliopes retained keyboards, allowing a live musician to play them if needed. During this period, compressed air began to replace steam as the vehicle of producing sound.

Most calliopes disappeared in the mid-20th century, as steam power was replaced with other power sources. Without the demand for technicians that mines and railroads supplied, no support was available to keep boilers running. Only a few calliopes have survived, and, unless converted to a modern power source, are rarely played. One such example is the Prairie Rose Carousel containing Band Organ #125 from the Johnson Organ Co. located at Chahinkapa Zoo in Wahpeton, North Dakota.

Pronunciation

The pronunciation of the word has long been disputed, and often it is pronounced differently inside and outside the groups that use it. The Greek muse by the same name is pronounced  , but the instrument was usually pronounced   by people who played it. A nineteenth-century magazine, Reedy's Mirror, attempted to settle the dispute by publishing this rhyme:

This, in turn, came from a poem by Vachel Lindsay, called "The Kallyope  Yell",
in which Lindsay uses both pronunciations.

In the song "Blinded by the Light", written in 1972, Bruce Springsteen used the four-syllable pronunciation commonly used in the United States when referring to a fairground organ; this was also used by the British Manfred Mann's Earth Band in their 1976 cover.

Related instruments

Pyrophone
The pyrophone is a calliope-like instrument that uses internal combustion within its whistles to power their notes, rather than externally produced.

At 1998's Burning Man, a pyrophone referred to as Satan's Calliope was powered by ignition of propane inside resonant cavities.  This device was incorrectly referred to as a "calliope", since a calliope is an external combustion instrument.

Calliaphone
The Calliaphone is an compressed air powered, easily transported, instrument developed by early 20th century American inventor Norman Baker.

Lustre chantant
The lustre chantant (literally "singing chandelier") or musical lamp was invented by Frederik Kastner.  It was a large chandelier with glass pipes of varying lengths each illuminated and heated by an individual gas jet. A keyboard allowed the player to turn down individual jets; as the glass tube cooled, a note was produced. Kastner installed several such instruments in Paris.

Popular culture
The Beatles, in recording "Being for the Benefit of Mr. Kite!" from the album Sgt. Pepper's Lonely Hearts Club Band, used tapes of calliope music to create the atmosphere of a circus. Beatles producer George Martin recalled, "When we first worked on 'Being for the Benefit of Mr. Kite!' John had said that he wanted to 'smell the sawdust on the floor', wanted to taste the atmosphere of the circus.  I said to him, 'What we need is a calliope.' 'A what?' 'Steam whistles, played by a keyboard. Unable to find an authentic calliope, Martin resorted to tapes of calliopes playing Sousa marches. "[I] chopped the tapes up into small sections and had Geoff Emerick throw them up into the air, re-assembling them at random."

See also
 Fairground organ
 Orchestrion
 Showman's road locomotive

Notes

References

External links

 Mechanical Music Digest: Calliope
 "Harmony in Steam"
 "Riverboat Calliopes" – includes audio clips of several riverboat calliopes
 The calliope of Delta Queen (divX video clip)
 "Europe's largest calliope aboard the ss Succes " – (Dutch) includes pictures & audio
 Steam calliopes on YouTube (playlist)
 Watch the National Film Board of Canada vignette Calliope
 :  Apparatus for producing music by steam or compressed air.
 Kratz Steam Calliope at The Mariners' Museum
 Popular Calliope and Steam Organ Videos
 How the Belle of Louisville Steam Calliope Works (PDF) Schematic diagram of the Belle of Louisville's calliope

American musical instruments
Canadian musical instruments
Internal fipple flutes
Pipe organ
Steam power
1855 introductions
Circus music
French-American culture
Quebec music